The 1879–80 season was the seventh Scottish football season in which Dumbarton competed at a national level.

Scottish Cup

Dumbarton began by beating the previous season's champions, Vale of Leven, in the first round.  Thereafter Dumbarton enjoyed some big wins, including an 11–0 thrashing of Clyde, to reach the semi final, only to lose out to eventual winners, Queen's Park, Scotland's top side at the time.

Glasgow Charity Cup

Dumbarton were one of the four invitees to take part in the Glasgow Charity Cup but lost out to Rangers in the semi final.

Friendlies

Dumbarton's fixture list continued to grow and expand across the country, with home and away fixtures being played against local rivals Vale of Leven, Rangers (Glasgow), Hearts and Hibs (Edinburgh) and Ayrshire Cup holders, Kilmarnock Athletic.  In all, 16 'friendly' matches were played during the season, of these 7 were won, 2 drawn and 7 lost, scoring 48 and conceding 30.

Player statistics

Only includes appearances and goals in competitive Scottish Cup matches.

Source:

International Caps

A series of international trial matches were played to consider selection of teams to represent Scotland in the upcoming games against England and Wales, the first taking place on 28 February where J Anderson, Archie Lang, Alex Lawrence and Joe Lindsay all took part. The following week Lang played for the 'Improbables' XI to finally decide on the eleven to play against England - but was unsuccessful.

A further trial was held on 20 March to decide on the team to play Wales and as a result, Dumbarton's first international caps were awarded when Archie Lang and Joe Lindsay were selected to play for Scotland on 27 March 1880, the match resulting in a 5-1 win for Scotland with Lindsay scoring one of the goals.

Representative Matches
A series of trial matches were played at Cathkin Park on 10 January 1880 to decide on a United Counties team to play Birmingham & District.  John Kennedy, Jock Hutcheson, Archie Lang and Alex Lawrence all played with Lang being selected for the final XI.  However as the game fell on the same day as the Scottish Cup semi final, he decided to play for the club.  

Five weeks later, on 14 February, Lang was selected to play for Scotch Counties against a Scottish Canadian XI at Kinning Park - the game ending in a 2-2 draw.

References

Dumbarton F.C. seasons
Scottish football clubs 1879–80 season